This article provides details of international football games played by the Iceland national football team from 2020 to present.

Results

2020

2021

2022

2023

Forthcoming fixtures
The following matches are scheduled:

Notes

References

Iceland national football team results
2020s in Icelandic sport